The 2011 Nigerian House of Representatives elections in Nasarawa State was held on April 9, 2011, to elect members of the House of Representatives to represent Nasarawa State, Nigeria.

Overview

Summary

Results

Nasarawa/Toto 
CPC candidate Musa Onwana Baba won the election, defeating other party candidates.

Lafia/Obi 
CPC candidate Kigbu Joseph Haruna won the election, defeating other party candidates.

Keffi/Karu/Kokona  
CPC candidate Ishaq Ahmed Kana won the election, defeating other party candidates.

Awe/Doma/Keana 
PDP candidate Mohammed Ogoshi Onawo won the election, defeating other party candidates.

Akwanga/Nasarawa/Eggon/Wamba 
CPC candidate David Ombugadu won the election, defeating other party candidates.

References 

Nasarawa State House of Representatives elections
2011 elections in Nigeria